The Barquisimeto rebellion began with an uprising of conservatives in Cumaná, Venezuela, in August 1853 demanding the return of José Antonio Páez. The rebellion was quickly defeated by the government, which increased its army to ten thousand men.

Outcome
A new revolt in Barquisimeto broke out on 12 July 1854 under the command of Juan Bautista Rodríguez, mutinying three thousand men; he immediately divided them into three battalions for a combined offensive inland. Fifteen days later, Rodríguez and 1,700 soldiers were defeated near his city by 2,500 government troops. On 28 July 1,000 rebels led by Antonio José Vásquez surrendered. The third battalion dissolved in Portuguesa into guerrilla bands. A new rebellion of 150 soldiers broke out on 31 July in the same city, but by mid-August they had surrendered.

See also 

 Venezuelan civil war of 1848–1849

References 

Rebellions in Venezuela
1850s in Venezuela
Barquisimeto
Cumaná
Conflicts in 1853
Conflicts in 1854